Road Movies is a 1995 minimalist composition for violin and piano by the American composer John Adams.

Composition 
Road Movies was written in 1995, as Adams was beginning to move beyond formal minimalism.

The piece is in three movements and lasts about 15 minutes in total. The movements are titled as follows:

References

Compositions by John Adams (composer)
1995 compositions
Chamber music compositions
Compositions for violin

fr:Road Movies